The Sheffield Chamber Orchestra is a standard classical orchestra of around 40 players which is based in Sheffield, England. Formed in 1950, the orchestra performs works suitable for Chamber Orchestra from the baroque to the present day. There are three concerts each year: a 'Winter Gala Concert' in late November or early December; a 'Spring Masterworks Concert' in early March; and then in May a 'Summer Festival Concert' where the orchestra is joined by local up-and-coming performers.  Whilst the orchestra is primarily amateur, it employs a professional conductor, Quentin Clare.  The orchestra is led by Ralph Dawson, also a professional.

External links
Official site

Musical groups from Sheffield
English orchestras